The War Claims Act of 1948, or Public Law 80-896 (62 Stat. 1240; 50 U.S.C.) is a United States federal law passed by the 80th United States Congress on July 3, 1948.  It created the War Claims Commission to adjudicate claims and pay out compensation to American prisoners of war and civilian internees of World War II.  It authorized ten prisoner of war and civilian internee compensation programs, and four war damage and loss compensation programs.  Payments and administrative expenses for all but three of the programs were paid by the liquidation of Japanese and German assets seized by the U.S. after World War II.  Payments to prisoners of war were at the rate of US$1 to $2.50 per day of imprisonment, payments to civilian internees of Japan amounted to $60 for each month of internment.  Civilians were also eligible for compensation for disability or death.  The act did not authorize compensation for civilian internees held by Germany.

References

1948 in law
United States public law
1948 in international relations
1948 in the United States
80th United States Congress